Lingshan station is an underground station on Line 4 of the Nanjing Metro that opened in January 2017 along with eighteen other stations as part of Line 4's first phase. It is located at Qilin Elevated Highway, Qixia District. The station is named after Lingshangen Village.

Exits shown in the Metro station are listed below:

* Elevator

References

Railway stations in Jiangsu
Railway stations in China opened in 2017
Nanjing Metro stations